Appias nephele is a species of pierine butterfly  endemic to the Philippines.

Subspecies
Appias nephele nephele (Philippines: Luzon)
Appias nephele aufidia Fruhstorfer, 1910 (Philippines: Basilan)
Appias nephele dilutior (Staudinger, 1889) Philippines: Palawan)
Appias nephele elis Fruhstorfer, 1910 (Philippines: Mindanao)
Appias nephele hostilia Fruhstorfer, 1910 (Philippines: Sulu Islands)
Appias nephele invitabilis Fruhstorfer, 1910 (Philippines: Mindoro)
Appias nephele leytensis Fruhstorfer, 1911 (Philippines: Leyte)

References

External links
 images representing Appias nephele  at Encyclopedia of Life

nephele
Butterflies described in 1861
Endemic fauna of the Philippines
Lepidoptera of the Philippines
Taxa named by William Chapman Hewitson